Bartłomiej Mróz (born 9 August 1994) is a Polish para badminton player who competes in international level events. Mróz made his Paralympic badminton debut at the 2020 Summer Paralympics. Mróz is also a three-time European champion in men's doubles SU5 at the European Para-Badminton Championships.

Personal life 
Mróz was born without his right forearm. In 2005, he joined the Municipal Interschool Sports Club in Kędzierzyn-Koźle, where he began to practice in para-badminton.

Achievements

World Championships 

Men's singles

Men's doubles

European Championships 
Men's singles

Men's doubles

Doubles

BWF Para Badminton World Circuit (3 runners-up) 
The BWF Para Badminton World Circuit – Grade 2, Level 1, 2 and 3 tournaments has been sanctioned by the Badminton World Federation from 2022.

Men's singles

International Tournaments (17 titles, 9 runners-up) 
Men's singles

Singles

Men's doubles

Mixed doubles

References

Notes 

1994 births
Living people
People from Kędzierzyn-Koźle
Polish male badminton players
Polish para-badminton players
Paralympic badminton players of Poland
Badminton players at the 2020 Summer Paralympics
20th-century Polish people
21st-century Polish people